Rudolf Bortz (born 22 June 1938) is a German former sports shooter. He competed in the 50 metre rifle, prone event at the 1964 Summer Olympics.

References

External links
 

1938 births
Living people
German male sport shooters
Olympic shooters of the United Team of Germany
Shooters at the 1964 Summer Olympics